Gaius Julius Caesar (100 BC – 44 BC), one of the most influential men in world history, has frequently appeared in literary and artistic works since ancient times.

Ancient works

Caesar is referred to in some of the poems of Catullus (ca. 84 – 54 BC)
The Commentarii de Bello Gallico (ca. 58 – 49 BC) and the Commentarii de Bello Civili (ca. 40 BC) are two autobiographical works Caesar used to justify his actions and cement popular support
The Tusculum portrait is possibly the only surviving portrait from Caesar's lifetime (ca. 50 – 40 BC)
The Chiaramonti Caesar is the other surviving and accepted bust of Caesar produced before the Roman Empire 
He is depicted in Virgil's Aeneid (ca. 29 – 19 BC), an epic poem about the foundation of Rome
The original Pantheon built by Marcus Agrippa (ca. 29 – 19 BC) contained a statue of Caesar alongside statues of Augustus Caesar and Agrippa. The statue was potentially destroyed when the Pantheon burned down in 80 AD.
He appears as a character in Lucan's Pharsalia (AD 61), an epic poem based on Caesar's Civil War

Medieval works

A legendary account of Caesar's invasions of Britain appears in Geoffrey of Monmouth's Historia Regum Britanniae (c. 1136).
In the 13th century French romance Faits des Romains, Caesar is made a bishop.
In the 13th century French chanson de geste Huon of Bordeaux, the fairy king Oberon is the son of Caesar and Morgan le Fay.
Caesar appears in Canto IV of Dante Alighieri's epic poem, the Divine Comedy (c. 1308–1321). He is in the section of Limbo reserved for virtuous non-Christians, along with Aeneas, Homer, Ovid, Horace and Lucan. His assassins, Brutus and Cassius, and his lover, Cleopatra, are seen among the souls of the wicked in the lower regions of hell.
Caesar was included as one of the Nine Worthies by Jacques de Longuyon in Voeux du Paon (1312). These were nine historical, scriptural, mythological or semi-legendary figures who, in the Middle Ages, were believed to personify the ideals of chivalry.
Caesar's Civil War and assassination are recounted in Geoffrey Chaucer's "Monk's Tale" (c. 1385, one of his Canterbury Tales)

Renaissance and modern works
In  (History of all Kings of Goths and Swedes) by Johannes Magnus, published in 1554. Caesar appears as a contemporary of the Swedish King Lindormus.

Theatre
William Shakespeare's Julius Caesar (1599)
George Chapman's Caesar and Pompey (c. 1604)
William Alexander's Julius Caesar (1607)
Ben Jonson's Catiline His Conspiracy (1611)
John Fletcher and Philip Massinger's The False One (c. 1620)
Jasper Fisher's Fuimus Troes (c. 1625)
Pierre Corneille's The Death of Pompey (1642)
Robert Garnier's Cornélie (1573)
Thomas Kyd's Cornelia (1594)

Operas
Giulio Cesare (1724), George Frideric Handel
La morte di Cesare (1788), Francesco Bianchi
Die Ermordung Cäsars (1959), Giselher Klebe
Young Caesar (1970), Lou Harrison

Statues
 Fountain of Caesar in Olomouc (1725). It is based on the statue by Gian Lorenzo Bernini depicting Constantine the Great in Scala Regia (Vatican).

Paintings
 The Death of Caesar (1798) by Vincenzo Camuccini

Modern works

Theatre

Caesar and Cleopatra (1898) by George Bernard Shaw
 Caesar (adapted from Shakespeare's play, 1937), Orson Welles's modern-dress bare-stage adaptation that evoked comparison to contemporary Fascist Italy and Nazi Germany.

Fiction
In Jonathan Swift's 1726 satire Gulliver's Travels, Gulliver has a conversation with evocations of Caesar and Brutus and Caesar confesses that all his glory doesn't equal the glory Brutus gained by murdering him. 
Cleopatra (1889) by Rider Haggard, a historical novel, depicts Julius Caesar's relationship with Cleopatra.
A Friend of Caesar: A Tale of the Fall of the Roman Republic (1900) by William Stearns Davis, follows a young nobleman who accompanies Caesar on his rise to power.
 The Story of the Amulet (1905), a children's time-travel novel by E. Nesbit, includes an episode with Julius Caesar on the eve of his invasion of Britain.
 The Magic City (1910), a children's fantasy novel by E. Nesbit, has Julius Caesar emerge from the pages of De Bello Gallico to rout the barbarians.
 Tros of Samothrace (1934), a historical novel by Talbot Mundy, has Julius Caesar as the novel's villain.
Freedom, Farewell! (1936) by Phyllis Bentley depicts Caesar as a tyrant. 
The Ides of March (1948), is an epistolary novel by Thornton Wilder.
The City of Libertines (1957), The Scarlet Mantle: A Novel of Julius Caesar (1978), and The Bloodied Toga: A Novel of Julius Caesar (1979) by the Canadian novelist W. G. Hardy, are a trilogy of novels covering Caesar's life.
Young Caesar (1958) and its sequel Imperial Caesar (1960), novels focusing on Caesar's life by Rex Warner. 
First Citizen (1987), by Thomas Thurston Thomas, a science fiction book based on the life and times of Julius Caesar but set in the 21st century.
Sword of Caesar (1987), in the Time Machine series, asks the reader to travel back to ancient Rome and find the fate of Caesar's battle sword.
Masters of Rome, a series of seven novels by the Australian writer, Colleen McCullough: The First Man in Rome (1991), The Grass Crown (1991), Fortune's Favorites (1993), Caesar's Women (1995), Caesar (1997), The October Horse (2002), and Antony and Cleopatra (2007). 
Roma Sub Rosa (1991–2018), a series of historical mysteries by the American writer, Steven Saylor.
Emperor, a series of five novels by the British writer, Conn Iggulden: The Gates of Rome (2003), The Death of Kings (2004), The Field of Swords (2005), The Gods of War (2006), and The Blood of Gods (2013).
The Cicero Trilogy by Robert Harris: Imperium (2006), Lustrum (2009), and Dictator (2015).

Film
 Cleopatra (1917) (Fritz Leiber)
 Cleopatra (1934) (Warren William)
 Caesar and Cleopatra (1945) (Claude Rains)
 The Bishop's Wife (1947): Dudley states that Wutheridge's coin was struck by Caesar to pay for Cleopatra's visit to Rome 
 Julius Caesar (1950) (Harold Tasker)
 Julius Caesar (1953) (Louis Calhern)
 Spartacus (1960) (John Gavin)
 Julius Caesar Against the Pirates (1962) (Gustavo Rojo)
 Cleopatra (1963) (Rex Harrison)
 Carry On Cleo (1964) (Kenneth Williams)
 Julius Caesar (1970) (John Gielgud)
 Asterix & Obelix Take On Caesar (1999) (Gottfried John)
 Druids (2001) (Klaus Maria Brandauer)
 Asterix & Obelix: Mission Cleopatra (2002) (Alain Chabat)
 Asterix at the Olympic Games (2008) (Alain Delon)
 Asterix and Obelix: God Save Britannia (2012) (Fabrice Luchini)
 Asterix and Obelix: Mansion of the Gods (2014) (Jim Broadbent)

Television
 Bewitched: "Samantha's Caesar Salad", Aunt Esmerelda tries to conjure up a Caesar salad, but conjures up Caesar, played by Jay Robinson
 Beyblade: Metal Masters: In Metal Fight Beyblade: Explosion, the Japanese dub of Metal Masters, Julian Konzern is known as Julius Caesar. This is possibly a homage to the fact Julian represents Italy and is part of Team Excalibur, the European representative team.
 Monty Python's Flying Circus: played by Graham Chapman in the sketches The Mouse Problem and Julius Caesar on an Aldis lamp, played by Eric Idle in the sketch Historical Impersonations.
 Cleopatra, played by Timothy Dalton
 Histeria!: Caesar's physical appearance is based on Frank Sinatra
 Horrible Histories, played by Ben Willbond/Adam Riches
 Julius Caesar played by Jeremy Sisto
 Empire, played by Colm Feore
 Rome, Gaius Julius Caesar (Rome character) played by Ciarán Hinds
 Spartacus, a 2004 television film adaption of the Howard Fast novel- Caesar, played by Richard Dillane is a minor role 
 Spartacus: War of the Damned, stars a younger Caesar played by Todd Lasance
 Ancient Rome: The Rise and Fall of an Empire,  a BBC documentary; played by Sean Pertwee
 Roman Empire, a Netflix documentary series, devotes its 2nd season to discussing his life. He is portrayed by Ditch Davey in the dramatic reconstructions.
 Wayne and Shuster's "Rinse the Blood off My Toga" spoofs Shakespeare's Julius Caesar as a Dragnet episode
 Xena: Warrior Princess and once on Hercules: The Legendary Journeys: Caesar was a major antagonist, played by Karl Urban
 SCTV: in a 1980 episode in which Bobby Bitman (Eugene Levy) portrays Caesar in a live television broadcast of the Shakespeare play telling bad jokes, which is then interrupted by a Russian satellite cutting into the broadcast feed of SCTV and showing Russian TV.
 DC's Legends of Tomorrow, Caesar is portrayed by Simon Merrells in the season three episode "Aruba-Con", where Caesar is displaced in time and ends up in Aruba in 2018, as well as in the season's finale, "The Good, the Bad, and the Cuddly", where he is possessed by the demon Mallus.
 The Epic Tales of Captain Underpants, where he appears in the episode "Captain Underpants and the Crazy Caustic Spray of the Contagious Cruelius Sneezer", where when George, Harold and the rest of the class time travel to Ancient Rome using Melvin’s time machine, they meet Julius Caesar. However, this interpretation of Caesar has an allergy to roses, so when he accidentally falls into a hot tub filled with roses and a chemical, he becomes Creulius Sneezer, an anthropomorphic nose with arms and legs. When this happens to Caesar, he attacks George, Harold and Mr. Krupp, but they and the students luckily get away and time travel back to the present.

Radio
In "The Histories of Pliny the Elder" – a 1958 episode of the British radio comedy "The Goon Show" parodying epic films – Caesar is portrayed by Peter Sellers as Hercules Grytpype-Thynne, with Moriarty as a centurion and sidekick.
In the BBC Radio 4 series Caesar! (2003–2007) written by Mike Walker, David Troughton played Julius Caesar in "Meeting at Formiae", the first episode of Series One.
In the "Life of Caesar" Podcast, by Cameron Reilly and Ray Harris Jr., which ran from 2013 to 2015 and continued onto Octavian in August 2015.

Comics
 A depiction of the Gallic War Commentaries of Caesar's, entitled "Caesar's Conquests", appeared in the now defunct Classics Illustrated comic series from the 1940s to the 1970s.
The Adventures of Alix, where he is the political protector of the main character.
Asterix comics, written by René Goscinny and drawn by Albert Uderzo, include a fictionalized Julius Caesar (complete with Roman nose) as the main antagonist.
Caesar appears in Neil Gaiman's Sandman #30, "August" (collected in The Sandman: Fables & Reflections).

Games
 Where in Time is Carmen Sandiego features Julius Caesar in one of its stages.
 Caesar is depicted as Akihiko Sanada's ultimate persona in Persona 3.
 Fallout: New Vegas depicts a dictator who patterns himself after the various Caesares, Julius in particular.
 Julius Caesar appears as the leader of the Roman Empire in several instalments of the Civilization series of strategy games.
 Caesar is mentioned in Assassin's Creed: Brotherhood as being a Templar, and that his assassination by Brutus and other members of the Assassins is to prevent the Templars from gaining power in Rome. 
 Caesar is also an important character in Assassin's Creed Origins, which depicts the Siege of Alexandria and the Battle of the Nile. Caesar is initially allied with the main protagonists, Bayek and Aya, but is shown to be working with the Order of the Ancients, an early incarnation of the Templars. Near the end of the game, Aya travels to Rome and is the first person to stab Caesar at his assassination.
 In Age of Empires: The Rise of Rome, a player can act as Julius Caesar.
 Gaius Julius Caesar appears as a servant in the mobile game Fate/Grand Order, summoned as the class of Saber.
 In the Total War: Rome 2 expansion Caesar in Gaul as a playable General.
 Julius Caesar is able to be summoned in Scribblenauts and its sequels.
 Caesar is depicted as the primary villain in A Courtesan of Rome, an interactive visual novel released in 2019 by Pixelberry Studios via their Choices: Stories You Play mobile app.
 Caesar is a playable character in the Mobile/PC Game Rise of Kingdoms.

Music
 Mentioned in the song "Weather with You" by Crowded House, "Strange affliction wash over me/Julius Caesar and the Roman Empire couldn't conquer the blue sky."
 Appears as a participant in an episode of Epic Rap Battles of History'' alongside Shaka Zulu.
 Inspiration for Bob Dylan's 2020 song "Crossing the Rubicon"
Mentioned in Bob Dylan's 2020 song "My Own Version of You" ("I pick a number between one and two / And ask myself what would Julius Caesar do")

Advertising
Benetton's 1988 "United Superstars of Benetton" print and billboard campaign, paired with Leonardo da Vinci
Little Caesars, chain of pizza restaurants

References

External links

 
Cultural depictions of ancient Roman people